Armenians in Istanbul are a major part of the Turkish Armenian community and historically one of the largest ethnic minorities of Istanbul, Turkey. The city is often referred to as Bolis (Պոլիս) by Armenians, which is derived from the ending of the historical name of the city Constantinople.

Today, most estimations put the number of Armenian-Turkish citizens in Istanbul at 50,000, 60,000 or 70,000. They constitute the largest Christian and non-Muslim minority in Istanbul, as well as in Turkey.

History
The Armenian community was made up of three religious denominations: Armenian Catholic, Armenian Protestant, and Armenian Apostolic, the Church of the vast majority of Armenians. The wealthy, Constantinople-based Amira class, a social elite whose members included the Duzians (Directors of the Imperial Mint), the Balyans (Chief Imperial Architects) and the Dadians (Superintendent of the Gunpowder Mills and manager of industrial factories).

The Ottoman Empire's Armenian genocide during World War I began with the deportation of 250 prominent Armenians from Constantinople.

Institutions
At present, the Armenian community in Istanbul has 20 schools (including the Getronagan Armenian High School), 17 cultural and social organizations, three newspapers (Agos, Jamanak, and Marmara), two sports clubs (Şişlispor and Taksimspor), and two health establishments, as well as numerous religious foundations set up to support these activities.

Notable Armenians from Istanbul
The following is the list of prominent Armenians who either were born in Istanbul (Constantinople) or have worked there.

Ottoman era (before 1923)

Aram Andonian, journalist
Arpiar Arpiarian, writer
Balyan family, dynasty of architects 
Hagop Baronian, writer, satirist
Nazaret Daghavarian, doctor
Erukhan, writer
Hagop Kazazian Pasha, minister of Finance
Komitas Vardapet, musician
Mkrtich Khrimian, religious leader, writer
Yervant Odian, writer, satirist
Ruben Sevak, writer
Levon Shant, playwright, writer
Mimar Sinan, architect
Siamanto, writer
Papken Siuni, political activist
Bedros Tourian, poet
Daniel Varujan, poet
Rupen Zartarian, writer, educator
Krikor Zohrab, statesman, author

Republican era (1923–present)

Arman Manukyan, professor, writer, economist
Şahan Arzruni, concert pianist
Hrant Dink, journalist, editor, columnist
Agop Dilâçar, linguist and the head specialist of the Turkish Language Association between 1942-1979
Udi Hrant Kenkulian, Turkish classical musician
Ara Güler, photographer
Sevan Nisanyan, writer
Daron Acemoglu, economist
Sevan Bıçakçı, jeweler

See also
Demographics of Istanbul
Organization of Istanbul Armenians
Armenians in Turkey
 Armenian Patriarchate of Constantinople

References

Further reading
Hovannisian, Richard G. (ed.), Armenian Constantinople. Costa Mesa, CA: Mazda Publishers, 2010.

Tchilingirian, Hratch, "The 'Other' Citizens: Armenians in Turkey between Isolation and (dis)Integration," Journal of the Society for Armenian Studies 25 (2017), pp. 156–84.

 
Armenian diaspora
Armenian diaspora in the Middle East
Christian communities